From April 26–27, 1991, multiple supercells across Oklahoma and Kansas led to a regional tornado outbreak. Forced by a potent trough and focused along a dryline, these distinct thunderstorms moved northeast through a moist and highly unstable environment. A total of 55 tornadoes were confirmed, many of which were strong, F2 or greater on the Fujita scale. A widely documented F5 tornado tore through Andover, Kansas, killing 17 people. Additional fatalities occurred from significant tornadoes in other portions of Kansas and Oklahoma, with 21 deaths recorded in total. A news team filming an F2 tornado sought shelter under a Kansas Turnpike overpass, causing a misconception that overpasses can provide adequate shelter during a tornado. This outbreak occurred within a transition period for the National Weather Service and proved the value of NEXRAD radars, which were utilized in Oklahoma to provide advanced warning to residents.

Meteorological synopsis

On April 25, 1991, the National Weather Service issued a warning of an impending weather system, noting that computer models were "indicating this to be a very significant severe weather producer with tornadoes occurring across the Central/Southern Plains." On the morning of April 26, the organization delineated a High risk of severe weather across the Great Plains. Through the morning hours, an 850 mb or approximately  low-level jet of up to  overspread regions from south-central Kansas northward into eastern Nebraska. A surface low-pressure area existed over southwestern Nebraska, supporting a dry line southward into Texas and a warm front southeastward across eastern sections of Kansas and Oklahoma.

In the unstable atmosphere between those two boundaries, surface dewpoints rose above . Abundant sunshine contributed to destabilization as lifted indices topped -12 from central Oklahoma into central Kansas and convective available potential energy reached 4,000 J/kg. A minimal capping inversion existed across Oklahoma even during the morning hours, and tornado-producing storms first developed across western Oklahoma around sunrise. These storms weakened as they moved northeast into Kansas. Back to the west, the dryline progressed rapidly eastward but began to slow precipitously during the afternoon hours. Attempts at thunderstorm development along this feature initially failed. At 17:10 UTC (12:20 p.m. CDT), the National Weather Service issued a particularly dangerous situation tornado watch, warning of the potential for multiple strong to violent tornadoes. This would be one of 24 convective watches issued during the day. Despite early failure at convective initiation, supercell thunderstorms rapidly erupted along the dryline during the afternoon hours as the jet streak propagated into the Great Plains, resulting in a regional outbreak of tornadoes stretching from Texas to Iowa. Violent tornadoes were concentrated in southern Kansas and Oklahoma, although intense tornadoes were also observed in Iowa, Texas, and Nebraska.

Confirmed tornadoes

Haysville–McConnell AFB–Andover, Kansas

At 5:49 p.m. CDT (22:49 UTC), the storm which would become the Wichita-Andover Tornado began east of Clearwater. At 6:05 p.m. CDT (23:05 UTC), the National Weather Service issued a statement urging residents in Haysville, Derby, and Mulvane to seek shelter. This was succeeded by a tornado warning four minutes later. Around 6:16 p.m. CDT (23:16 UTC), the intensifying tornado began to affect southeastern sections of Wichita and directly struck Haysville. In eastern Wichita, some well-built houses in the Greenwich Heights Subdivision were completely leveled, indicative of strong F3 to F4 damage. Four people were killed at this location. At 6:24 p.m. CDT (23:24 UTC), the violent tornado struck the McConnell Air Force Base, where it narrowly missed a lineup of 10 B1-B bombers each worth $280 million and 2 of which were equipped with nuclear warheads. Nine major facilities on the base were destroyed, including the officer's club, base hospital, library, and elementary school. In addition, 102 housing units were demolished. No fatalities were recorded there, though 16 people were injured and total losses reached $62 million. As the tornado continued to move toward U.S. Route 54 in Kansas in the direction of Andover, it prompted forecasters to issue a heightened tornado warning alerting residents in Augusta and Andover that a damaging tornado was approaching. Despite this warning, the tornado sirens in Andover failed.

At 6:31 p.m. CDT (23:31 UTC), with the sirens not functional, the police drove through the Golden Spur Mobile Home Park and through the town warning residents to seek shelter. 10 minutes later, the large wedge-shaped tornado entered southern Andover and began to impact the mobile home park, which ultimately sustained a direct hit. Of the 244 manufactured homes, 205, or about 84 percent of them, were destroyed. Post-storm interviews by health officials found that 339 residents were home during the tornado, of which 146 evacuated, 149 sought refuge in the community shelter, and 38 remained in their homes. No casualties occurred among individuals who fled or utilized the shelter. However, 13 people were killed, another 17 were hospitalized, and 9 sustained minor injuries among the group who remained in their structures. Additional homes were swept from their foundations to the west of this park, where the Andover tornado earned its F5 rating. Throughout the city, over 1,500 residences were devastated. The tornado continued northeast, affecting the outskirts of Towanda. Twenty minutes later, the violent tornado dissipated west of El Dorado and north of the Kansas Turnpike, though the parent supercell later produced additional tornadoes. Along the tornado's path, 84 frame houses and 14 businesses were leveled. A total of 225 people were injured. It was the final Kansas tornado to be given an F5 rating prior to the implementation of the Enhanced Fujita Scale, which was principally used on the Greensburg EF5 tornado on May 4, 2007.

El Dorado Lake/Kansas Turnpike Underpass, Kansas

After causing widespread destruction in Andover, the parent supercell continued northeast and produced another strong tornado. The tornado gained notoriety when a Kansas television crew sought shelter underneath an overpass on the Kansas Turnpike. Video from the crew shows a minivan several hundred yards down the turnpike being rolled multiple times, with other vehicles such as large semi-trailer trucks overturned and severely damaged as well. Alongside the 1979 Wichita Falls F4 tornado, this marked the second prominent example of people seeking refuge from a tornado underneath an overpass. Information from the National Weather Service initially and indirectly contributed to this line of thought as well. 

During the 1999 Oklahoma tornado outbreak, the consequences of this practice were realized. On May 3, 1999, there were three locations where a highway overpass was utilized as a shelter from approaching tornadoes, and at all three locations there was at least one fatality. One of these, the 1999 Bridge Creek–Moore tornado, was at violent F4–F5 intensity as impacted the overpass. One incorrect notion from the Kansas Turnpike video was that the film crew was protected by the weaker nature of the tornado as it passed over a primarily rural area, in contrast to the Bridge Creek–Moore tornado. However, another F2 on May 3, 1999, killed one individual, proving that tornadoes of any intensity are capable of killing people harboring under overpasses. In addition to the fatalities, many people who survived these tornadoes nonetheless suffered graphic injuries and sometimes permanent disabilities. Since the Kansas Turnpike video and events on May 3, meteorologists have strongly advised people to avoid seeking shelter under highway overpasses for many reasons. One, it exposes individuals to flying debris, which is the number one cause of death in tornadoes. Two, the elevated nature of the overpass subjects people to stronger winds than at ground level. Three, overpasses may act to channel and accelerate the wind. Four, many overpasses do not have girders for individuals to hold onto, such as was the case during the Kansas Turnpike video. Fifth, tornadic winds shift directions as the vortex passes, such that people originally protected from winds will still be exposed to its effects following the wind shift. The National Weather Service therefore notes, "seeking shelter under a highway overpass is to become a stationary target for flying debris, with a substantial risk of being blown out and carried by the tornado winds". Additionally, such a move slows the flow of traffic and subjects other individuals to a potentially life-threatening situation.

Red Rock, Oklahoma

To the south of several significant supercells in Kansas, another discrete storm produced a tornado at 6:30 p.m. In this area, it reached F3 intensity, snapping power poles, toppling well pumps, demolishing a house, and destroying oil tanks. As it neared Interstate 35 and crossed into Noble County, the tornado first reached F4 intensity, flattening a house and debarking many trees. In neighboring Osage County, two farms were destroyed before the tornado continued into Osage County. There, it passed west of Pawhuska, toppling an oil rig with an  foundation. It lifted west-northwest of that city. Along the tornado's path across sparsely populated areas, several county roads had portions of their asphalt stripped away. A University of Oklahoma chase team headed by Howard Bluestein utilized mobile doppler weather radar to analyze the tornado. At the time, this represented the strongest winds ever measured by radar, including the first measurements of F5 intensity winds.

Aftermath

In the wake of the tornado outbreak, Kansas Governor Joan Finney requested that President George H.W. Bush supply Sedgwick, Butler, and Cowley counties with federal disaster aid, a move that the president later approved. Under the $2.6 million program, the Federal Emergency Management Agency (FEMA) paid 75 percent of the cost for disaster cleanup, while the local government paid 15 percent, and the state paid the remaining 10 percent. Oklahoma Governor David Walters likewise requested federal assistance for six counties in his state. American Red Cross and civil defense officials scoured devastated homes and rendered aid to about 370 families affected by the storms. After two Oklahoma counties were not granted disaster assistance, local officials in Garfield and Washington counties criticized FEMA's decision. The organization responded by noting that additional counties could be added to the list in the future but that damage in those counties was marginal for a presidential declaration. Two days later, federal assistance was made available to both counties.

In the Oologah–Talala school district of Oklahoma, which was all but devastated during the tornado outbreak, the Oklahoma State Department of Education voted to forgive the remaining 23 days of classes, the largest number of instructional days forgiven in a single school year on record at the time. Individual student conferences were held at a local church. About 170 construction workers worked double shifts to repair the school grounds, which were tentatively set to reopen on August 12. Of the district's 24 buses, 15 were repaired in the weeks following the tornado outbreak, while 9 were rendered inoperable. The school district reopened on August 15.

The 1991 outbreak occurred during a period of modernization for the National Weather Service and helped highlight the value of radar imagery for detecting tornadoes. In April 1991, the WSR-88D NEXRAD radar in Norman, Oklahoma, was the only radar of its kind with Doppler capabilities, and even then it had not been cleared for use in day-to-day operations. For comparison, the outdated radars in that state, though closer, did not depict significant features indicative of an ongoing tornado. Instead, forecasters in Kansas were forced to rely on reports from the public and storm chasers. In an internal assessment of the event, the National Weather Service concluded that "The NWS should continue to implement the Next Generation Radar (NEXRAD) network across the Nation. This event illustrates the usefulness of the WSR-88D velocity fields and better azimuthal resolution reflectivity data." The implementation of these radars have improved tornado lead times in modern years.

The outbreak was featured in two different documentaries: Enemy Wind, a documentary produced by The Weather Channel, and Cyclone, a documentary produced and distributed by National Geographic under its National Geographic Home Video series.

See also
 Tornadoes of 1991
 List of North American tornadoes and tornado outbreaks
 List of Storm Prediction Center high risk days

Notes

References

External links
 Gene Moore's April 26, 1991 Chase Account
 
 

F5 tornadoes
Tornadoes of 1991
Tornadoes in Oklahoma
Tornadoes in Kansas
Butler County, Kansas
Sedgwick County, Kansas
April 26 tornado outbreak, 1991
Andover, Kansas tornado
April 1991 events in the United States